C. elegans elegans may refer to :
 Calocheiridius elegans elegans, a pseudoscorpion subspecies
 Calochortus elegans elegans, a plant subspecies
 Cardiocondyla elegans elegans, an ant subspecies
 Carinostoma elegans elegans, a harvestman subspecies
 Caucasorhynchia elegans elegans, an extinct subspecies of brachiopods
 Celeus elegans elegans, the Russet-crested woodpecker, a subspecies of the chestnut woodpecker
 Centruroides elegans elegans, a scorpion subspecies found in Mexico
 Ceropales elegans elegans, a wasp subspecies
 Cephalota elegans elegans, a beetle subspecies
 Ceropegia elegans elegans, a plant subspecies
 Chaetanthera elegans elegans, a flowering plant subspecies found in Chile
 Chersotis elegans elegans, a moth subspecies
 Chitaura elegans elegans a subspecies of spur-throated grasshopper
 Chrysis elegans elegans, a wasp subspecies
 Coleonyx elegans elegans, a gecko subspecies
 Collaria elegans elegans, an amoebozoan subspecies
 Cormocephalus elegans elegans, a centipede subspecies
 Corydalis elegans elegans, a plant subspecies
 Cunninghamella elegans elegans, a fungus subspecies
 Cymatoderma elegans elegans, a fungus subspecies
 Cynosurus elegans elegans, a grass subspecies

Synonyms 
 Curimata elegans elegans, a synonym for Steindachnerina elegans, a fish

See also 
 C. elegans (disambiguation)